who plays as a central midfielder for  club Kashima Antlers.

Playing career
Nago was born in Osaka Prefecture on April 17, 1996. He joined J1 League club Kashima Antlers in 2018.

In 2021, Nago was loaned out to J1 club, Shonan Bellmare.

Career statistics

References

External links

1996 births
Living people
Juntendo University alumni
Association football people from Osaka Prefecture
Japanese footballers
J1 League players
Kashima Antlers players
Shonan Bellmare players
Association football midfielders
Universiade gold medalists for Japan
Universiade medalists in football